This a list of the tallest buildings in Saint John, New Brunswick.

Saint John is a city on the Fundy coast of New Brunswick and is the first incorporated city in Canada. The tallest building in the city is the 19-storey,  Brunswick Square. This building is tied with Assumption Place in Moncton for tallest building in New Brunswick. However this building is the second largest office building by floor space in all of Atlantic Canada after the Maritime Centre in Halifax.

, Irving Oil has begun construction on a new headquarters in Uptown Saint John, next to the imperial theatre. If constructed, the Coast Guard Redevelopment will be the single largest residential construction project ever undertaken in New Brunswick.   there are no other high-rises under construction, approved for construction, or proposed for construction in Saint John.

Tallest buildings

This list ranks buildings in Saint John that stand at least 30 metres (98 ft) tall, based on CTBUH height measurement standards. This includes spires and architectural details but does not include antenna masts.

Tallest under construction and proposed

Other important structures

City Market
The Saint John City Market is the oldest continuing farmer's market in Canada, with a charter dating from 1785. Located in Saint John, New Brunswick and completed in 1876, the current market building has a unique roof structure that resembles an inverted ship's keel. Made of wooden trusses, the structure was reportedly built by unemployed ship carpenters of the day. Also, the floor slopes with the natural grade of the land. The architecture is in the Second Empire style.

Some of the businesses in the market have been operating continuously there for more than 100 years. Facing onto Kings Square, the market is connected to the city's indoor pedway system.

The market was designated a National Historic Site of Canada in 1986.

Courtenay Bay Generating Station
The Courtenay Bay Generating Station is a decommissioned oil-fired power plant owned by NB Power. The plant generated 113 megawatts of baseline electricity for the province between 1960 and 2008. In 1998, the plant was considered for conversion to natural gas as the primary fuel source, but this never came to be.

See also

List of tallest buildings in Atlantic Canada
Canadian architecture

References

Saint John
 
Tallest buildings in Saint John